World World World can refer to:

World World World (Asian Kung-Fu Generation album), a 2008 album
World World World (Orange Range album), a 2009 album